The 2014–15 Wagner Seahawks men's basketball team represented Wagner College during the 2014–15 NCAA Division I men's basketball season. The Seahawks were led by third year head coach Bashir Mason. They played their home games at Spiro Sports Center and were members of the Northeast Conference. They finished the season 10–20, 8–10 in NEC play to finish in a tie for seventh place. They lost in the quarterfinals of the NEC tournament to Robert Morris.

Roster

Schedule

|-
!colspan=9 style="background:#004236; color:#CCCCCC;"| Regular season

|-
!colspan=9 style="background:#004236; color:#CCCCCC;"| Northeast Conference tournament

References 

Wagner Seahawks men's basketball seasons
Wagner
Wagner Seahawks men's b
Wagner Seahawks men's b